Killingholme Admiralty Platform railway station, known locally as Admiralty Platform, was near North Killingholme Haven, Lincolnshire, England.

The station was opened by the London and North Eastern Railway at some time between 1923 and 1930 as a later addition to the branch line from Goxhill to Immingham Dock, near both the former seaplane base at RNAS Killingholme and the Admiralty oil terminal at North Killingholme Haven.

Like its neighbour Killingholme, Admiralty Platform had a single, straight, wooden platform with minimal facilities. These were still intact when a RCTS Special called four years after closure on 7 October 1967.

The station was unusual in several respects:

 although opened primarily to serve a naval base it was a public station, at least outside wartime
 it evaded maps, including OS maps
 it evaded timetables
 it evaded Signalling Record Society records
and
 no tickets were thought to survive which show the station as a starting point, but an example has now been found, (see picture).

The station closed on 17 June 1963 along with the other stations on the line.

When the line and station opened the area was rural and thinly populated. By 2015 the area round the former station had become industrial but remained thinly populated. The track through the station site was still in use for freight.

References

Sources

External links
 Railtour visit 6 October 1967 Six Bells Junction
 Services from New Holland not showing the station Disused Stations UK
 The station not on a 1930 OS map National Library of Scotland
 The station not on a 1948 OS map npe maps
 The station not on a 1953 OS map National Library of Scotland
 The station not on a 1961 OS map National Library of Scotland
 The station Rail Map Online
 The station and section of line railwaycodes
 The station on a 1941 aerial photo at p28 National grid
 Aerial image of the station taken in 1930 Britain from Above (free login needed to zoom)
 Aerial image of the station taken in 1930 Britain from Above (free login needed to zoom)
 

Disused railway stations in the Borough of North Lincolnshire
Former London and North Eastern Railway stations
Railway stations in Great Britain closed in 1963